Arthur Homer Bird (23 July 1856 – 22 December 1923) was an American composer, for many years resident in Germany. Born in Cambridge, Massachusetts, he studied in Europe and spent a year at Weimar with Franz Liszt. He composed a symphonic poem, Eine Karneval-Szene, Op. 5, and a Symphony in A major, Op. 8 (both in 1886); three orchestral suites; some works for wind instruments alone; some music for the ballet; a comic opera; and some chamber music; he was also commissioned by the Mason and Hamlin company to write a suite of short pieces for the reed organ.

He married Wilhelmine Waldemann in Peterborough, England in 1888.

Bird died while riding on a train in Berlin in 1923.

References

External links

1856 births
1923 deaths
American male classical composers
American classical composers
Pupils of Franz Liszt
American expatriates in Germany